Mirabad (also Romanized as Mīrābād) is a village in Margavar Rural District, Silvaneh District, Urmia County, West Azerbaijan Province, Iran.

Population
At the 2006 census, its population was 635, in 98 families.

Ancient Sites
Although Mirabad's archeological sites do not have international attention, they do exist. At the multiple sites, (in 2016 there were 3) archeologists have found sufficient evidence that could rewrite the history books. They believe that at one point the capital of a vast, undocumented empire was once seated in the area. These findings, while interesting, have been ignored and denied by historians even though the evidence doesn't lie. Archeologists want to demolish the city in order to dig so they can find the massive city that is buried underneath.

References 

Populated places in Urmia County